is a railway station in the city of Ichinomiya, Aichi Prefecture, Japan, operated by Meitetsu.

Lines

Station layout
The station has two opposed side platforms, connected by a level crossing, with track one on a passing loop. The station has automated ticket machines, Manaca automated turnstiles and is unattended.

Platforms

Adjacent stations

|-
!colspan=5|Nagoya Railroad

Station history
Hagiwara Station was opened on October 1, 1899 as a station on the privately held Bisai Railroad, which was purchased by Meitetsu on August 1, 1925 becoming the Meitetsu Bisai Line. It was remodeled in 1955, and in 2007 it was outfitted with gates compatible with Tranpass fare cards and made unstaffed.

Passenger statistics
In fiscal 2013, the station was used by an average of 2566 passengers daily.

Surrounding area
Hagiwara Elementary School
Japan National Route 155

See also
 List of Railway Stations in Japan

References

External links

 Official web page 

Railway stations in Japan opened in 1899
Railway stations in Aichi Prefecture
Stations of Nagoya Railroad
Ichinomiya, Aichi